Eriphia is a genus of marine crustaceans in the family Eriphiidae, commonly known as sea spiders (or pycnogonids). The genus is widely distributed in the world's oceans and includes both pelagic (open water) and benthic (bottom-dwelling) species.

Species
The genus contains the following species:

References

Eriphioidea